Students' Union UCL (formerly University College London Union) is the students' union of University College London. Founded in 1893, it is one of the oldest students' unions in England, although postdating the Liverpool Guild of Students which formed a student representative council in 1892. It was formed with the following objectives: "the promotion of social intercourse and of the means of recreation, physical and mental, of the students of University College, and the financial successes of students' clubs". UCL Union was the first of its kind as it was formed for both athletics clubs and social activities alike.

Since its formation, the Union has taken on responsibility for many aspects of student life. Events for example were seen as a key element hence the establishment of an Ents Committee. A student magazine known as the Gazette was formed a few years later and the Somers Town sports venue was also acquired.

Students' Union UCL is affiliated to the National Union of Students.

Organisation 

Students' Union UCL runs over 300 clubs and societies, as well as 4 bars, 4 cafés, 1 shop and a fitness centre. UCL students through the Union have access to put on shows at the Bloomsbury Theatre.

The Union's sports clubs have access to several different venues including Bloomsbury Fitness, the Somers Town Sports Centre and the  Shenley Sports grounds, which Watford Football Club rent for training purposes. Arsenal F.C. rented it as training grounds until 1999. In October 1999 they opened the purpose built Arsenal Training Centre on a neighbouring 143 acres. On the other side is the de Havilland Aircraft Heritage Centre.

Students' Union UCL provides support to students through Jobshop and the Advice Service, and has a highly active Volunteering Services unit, providing volunteering opportunities for over 1400 students a year.

As well as the magazine Pi, the Union's media output includes the radio station Rare FM, the "alternative" magazine The Cheese Grater and a number of smaller publications.

Charity Status 
Operation of the Union lies mainly with elected full-time officers called sabbatical officers and appointed staff. The UCL Union is a registered charity in UK law, a status which requires it to have a trustee board. The board is composed of four of the elected UCLU sabbatical officers (sabbatical trustees), four elected student trustees, and three appointed external trustees. Trustees are charged with responsibility for controlling the charity's work, management and administration on behalf of its members.

Clubs and societies 
UCL has numerous clubs and societies which include, sports, film, drama, martial arts, politics and degree-subjects.

The Union's Debating Society, founded in 1829 as the Literary and Philosophical Society, is one of the oldest student debating societies in the UK.

The UCL Film & TV Society, founded in 1948, is one of the oldest in the country, it still has a dedicated studio space on campus and continues to both make and screen films; Christopher Nolan and Emma Thomas met and developed some of their earliest films at the society.

References

External links
Students' Union UCL web site

University College London
Students' unions in London
Organizations established in 1893
1893 establishments in England
Students' unions in England